Gymnodoris arnoldi is a species of colourful sea slug, a dorid nudibranch, a marine gastropod mollusk in the family Polyceridae. It was first described in 1957.

Distribution
This species is known from southeastern Australia.

Description
Gymnodoris arnoldi has an orange-red body with translucent white rhinophores.

Ecology
This species eats colonial ascidians.

References

Polyceridae
Gastropods described in 1957